The 2006–07 Kategoria e Parë was the 60th season of a second-tier association football league in Albania.

League table

References

 Calcio Mondiale Web

Kategoria e Parë seasons
2
Alba